Imre Stankovics (born 27 February 1950) is a Hungarian racewalker. He competed in the men's 20 kilometres walk at the 1976 Summer Olympics.

References

1950 births
Living people
Athletes (track and field) at the 1976 Summer Olympics
Hungarian male racewalkers
Olympic athletes of Hungary
Place of birth missing (living people)